Club Deportivo Iliturgi was a Spanish football team based in Andújar, Jaén, in the autonomous community of Andalusia. Founded in 1922 and dissolved in 2007, they played in the Tercera División for 25 seasons, and held home matches at Campo Municipal de Fútbol Santa Úrsula, with a capacity of 1,000 people.

History
Founded in 1922, Iliturgi first reached the Tercera División in 1947, and played for 23 consecutive seasons in the category before folding in 1970. Four years later, a new club was founded in the city, under the name of Iliturgi CF, and played senior football for 20 years (13 of them in Tercera) before also disappearing.

In 1994, shortly after Iliturgi CF's dissolution, CD Iliturgi returned to an active status, returning to a national division in 2000. Relegated in 2002, they played for a further five campaigns before achieving promotion back to the fourth division in 2007, after winning their group in the Primera Andaluza. In September 2007, after two no-shows in the first two fixtures of the 2007–08 Tercera División, the club was dissolved.

In 2008, a new club was founded in the city under the name of CD Iliturgi CF, but they folded in 2015. One year later, Iliturgi CF 2016 was created.

Season to season

25 seasons in Tercera División

References

Defunct football clubs in Andalusia
Association football clubs established in 1922
Association football clubs disestablished in 2007
1922 establishments in Spain
2007 disestablishments in Spain